Amminadab I (Ammonite: 𐤏𐤌𐤍𐤃𐤁 *ʿamīnādāb; Akkadian: 𒄠𒈪𒈾𒀜𒁉 am-mi-na-ad-bi; "my people are generous") was king of Ammon c. 650 BCE. He is mentioned in Assyrian inscriptions from the reign of Assurbanipal. He was one of the rebellious client kings punished by Assurbanipal during the latter's Arabian campaign. He is mentioned on an inscription on a bottle unearthed at Tel Siran in Jordan, which inscription reads: 'mndb mlk bn'mn (Ammonite: 𐤏𐤌𐤍𐤃𐤁 𐤌𐤋𐤊 𐤁𐤍𐤏𐤌𐤍) / bn hsl'l mlk bn'mn (Ammonite: 𐤁𐤍 𐤄𐤔𐤋𐤀𐤋 𐤁𐤍𐤏𐤌𐤍) / bn'mndb mlk bn'mn (Ammonite: 𐤁𐤍𐤏𐤌𐤍𐤃𐤁 𐤌𐤋𐤊 𐤁𐤍𐤏𐤌𐤍)  "Amminadab [II] king of the Ammonites son of Hassal'il king of the Ammonites son of Amminadab king of the Ammonites [I]."

References

Kings of Ammon
7th-century BC people